Ayinger Brewery is in Aying, Bavaria, Germany, about 25 km south of Munich. Ayinger beers are exported to Italy, the United States, and the rest of Europe.

Licensed production in UK

For some years, a range of beer was brewed under the Ayingerbrau name by Samuel Smith's Brewery in Tadcaster, England.  Although the Ayinger logo was used, the recipes and range were different from those of the Ayinger Brewery.  The arrangement ended in spring 2006, at which point Samuel Smith's rebranded the beers.  Distribution of the Ayinger range of beer followed that summer.

Oktoberfest
Because the Oktoberfest in Munich does not allow breweries outside its city limits to participate, Ayinger Brewery organizes many smaller festivals in the countryside around Munich.

Awards

World Beer Championships

2007 World Beer Championships 
Ayinger posted these results at the 2007 World Beer Championships:
Celebrator Doppelbock - highest rated Doppelbock style 
Jahrhundert-Bier - highest rated Munich Helles style
Oktober Fest-Märzen - highest rated Vienna Märzen style 
Altbairisch Dunkel - 2nd highest rated Dark Lager style

Prior Years 
Since 1994, Ayinger has received these awards:
Celebrator Doppelbock - 2005 Platinum Medal Winner 
1994, 1995, 1996, 1997: Top Ten Breweries in the World 
2003, 2004, and 2005 Ayinger received a first-place award for every beer entered

German Agricultural Society International Competition 
In the Deutsche Landwirtschafts Gesellschaft (DLG) Competition, Ayinger earned these medals:
Jahrhundert-Bier - 1997 Gold medal, 1998 Gold, 2000 Gold, 2001-2004 Silver medal, 2005 Gold
Bräu-Hell - 2001 Gold, 2003-2005 Gold
Bräu-Weisse - 1997 Gold, 1998 Gold, 2000 Gold, 2001 Silver, 2002-2005 Gold
Ur-Weiße - 2004 Gold, 2005 Gold
Altbairisch-Dunkel - 1997 Gold, 1998 Silver, 2001 Silver, 2003-2005 Gold
Leichte Bräu-Weisse - 1998 Silver, 2000 Silver

See also 
 German beer

References

External links 
 Ayinger Brewery website
 Ayinger on U.S. importer's website
 Ayinger's UK distributor

Beer and breweries in Bavaria
Breweries in Germany
Companies based in Bavaria
1877 establishments in Bavaria
Buildings and structures in Munich (district)